Hilde Bergebakken (born 2 January 1963) is a Norwegian politician for the Socialist Left Party.

She served as a deputy representative to the Norwegian Parliament from Sør-Trøndelag during the term 1993–1997. In total she met during 11 days of parliamentary session.

References

1963 births
Living people
Socialist Left Party (Norway) politicians
Deputy members of the Storting
Sør-Trøndelag politicians
Place of birth missing (living people)
20th-century Norwegian women politicians
20th-century Norwegian politicians
Women members of the Storting